Variovorax ginsengisoli is a Gram-negative, non-spore-forming, rod-shaped, motile bacterium from the genus Variovorax, which was isolated from soil from a ginseng field in Pocheon in South Korea. Colonies of V. ginsengisoli are yellowish in color.

References

External links
Type strain of Variovorax ginsengisoli at BacDive -  the Bacterial Diversity Metadatabase

Comamonadaceae
Bacteria described in 2010